Mike Bacsik may refer to:

Mike Bacsik (2000s pitcher), (born 1977), left-handed pitcher
Mike Bacsik (1970s pitcher), (born 1952), right-handed pitcher